Charles Henry Templeton (24 November 1806 – 2 March 1834) was an English cricketer with amateur status. He was associated with Cambridge University and Kent and made his first-class debut in 1827. He was educated at Winchester College and Trinity College, Cambridge.

References

1806 births
1834 deaths
English cricketers
English cricketers of 1826 to 1863
Cambridge University cricketers
Kent cricketers
People educated at Winchester College
Alumni of Trinity College, Cambridge